The Oregon high desert is a region of the U.S. state of Oregon located east of the Cascade Range and south of the Blue Mountains, in the central and eastern parts of the state. The southwest region is part of the Great Basin and the southeast is the lower Owyhee River watershed. The northern region is part of the Columbia Plateau, where higher levels of rainfall allow the largest industry on private land to be the cultivation of alfalfa and hay. Public land within the region is owned primarily by the Bureau of Land Management, which manages more than  including five rivers designated as Wild and Scenic.

While the high desert is somewhat dry, it is only arid relative to Western Oregon. The region averages  of annual rainfall; the Alvord Desert, however, receives only  of rain each year. Contrary to its name, most of the high desert is not dry enough to truly qualify as desert, and biologically, most of the region is classified as scrubland or steppe.

The broad fault-block mountain is characteristic of the basin and range plate tectonics of the high desert. About 16 million years ago, during the early Miocene epoch, lava flows from volcanic eruptions covered about half the surface area of Oregon. The Earth's crust then began stretching, giving way to further volcanic activity from 15 million to 2 million years ago. Several ice ages over this time formed the large lakes in the high desert.

The climate of the high desert provides habitat for mammals such as pronghorn, coyote, mule deer, black-tailed jackrabbit, and cougar. Birds common in the region include sage-grouse, California quail, and prairie falcon. The western juniper is the most common tree in the region, and big sagebrush and common woolly sunflower are the region's most widespread plants.

Geography

The high desert of Oregon is located in the central and southeastern part of the state. Most of the region is located in Crook, Deschutes, Harney, Lake, and Malheur counties.

It is bordered by the eastern foothills of the Cascade Range to the west. The Blue Mountains are the geographical boundary to the north, marking the northern end of the high desert's semi-arid plateau. The southern high desert is part of North America's Basin and Range Province, which extends south through Nevada and Arizona and into Mexico. To the east, the high desert country of the Columbia Plateau extends across the Snake River and into Idaho.

A number of rivers flow through the high desert region. These include the Deschutes River and its tributary the Crooked River, as well as the Malheur, Owyhee, and John Day rivers, which are all within the Columbia River watershed. Because the high desert encompasses the portion of the hydrographic Great Basin located in Oregon, smaller rivers in the high desert flow into closed basins. The Chewaucan River, the Donner und Blitzen River, and the Silvies River each flow into some of the high desert's salt lakes.

Land use

The largest landowner in eastern Oregon is the U.S. government. In addition, Congress has designated specific sections of the Crooked, Deschutes, Donner und Blitzen, Malheur, and Owyhee rivers as part of the National Wild and Scenic Rivers System.

Agriculture is the largest industry in the region. Livestock ranches utilize large tracts of private and government land for grazing. Ranchers raise cattle and sheep in many parts of the region. Because of low rainfall, most crops require irrigation. Agricultural crops include alfalfa and other hay crops, wheat, oats, barley, potatoes, onions, sugar beets, and mint.

Geology

Between 17 and 15 million years ago, magma from deep beneath eastern Oregon rose to the Earth's surface, causing a period of significant volcanic activity. A series of lava floods erupted from fissures near the Oregon–Idaho–Washington border. Eventually, these lava flows covered half the state of Oregon, creating a formation known as the Columbia River Basalt Group, the geologic foundation beneath much of the high desert.

After the original eruptions subsided, the Earth's crust began to stretch and crack. Between 15 and 2 million years ago, this created hundreds of new volcanoes that added additional layers of lava on top of the Columbia River Basalt and left behind hundreds of lava tubes. These new flows blanketed the southeastern third of the state. Many of the volcanoes and smaller cinder cones from this period still exist in eastern Oregon. Afterwards, subsequent rifting produced large fault-block mountains throughout the region. The escarpment-type mountains and high-elevation valleys created by these faults produced the basin and range landscape that makes up much of Oregon's high desert country.

During the last 2 million years, a series of ice ages altered the landscape. As each ice sheet melted, runoff and increased rainfall filled many of the region's closed basins, forming large pluvial lakes. The Goose Lake, Harney, and Klamath basins were filled along with many other smaller basins. However, as the climate became drier, these large lakes shrank away. Goose Lake, Harney Lake, Malheur Lake, Summer Lake, Lake Abert, and the Warner Lakes are remnants of ancient pluvial lakes.

Climate

Bend, the region's largest city, only receives  of precipitation per year. Some of the mountainous areas, however, receive significantly more precipitation as snowfall.

The majority of high desert areas receive most precipitation in the winter months, decreasing steadily through late summer into the fall. Some areas in the eastern and southern parts of the region receive peak precipitation in the late spring and early summer. For example, at Hart Mountain in Lake County, the wettest time of the year is March through June. The driest months throughout Oregon's high desert are July through September, though there are still isolated thunderstorms during that period.

History

Native peoples and white settlement

The indigenous people of the high desert region are the Northern Paiute people. These Native Americans were once semi-nomadic hunter-gatherers who relied on nuts, roots, seeds, berries, eggs, and animals such as deer, pronghorn, geese, quail, rabbits, and bear, following their food to high and low elevations depending on the time of year. They make sandals, traps, and fishing nets, and weave baskets. Made out of sagebrush, willow, tule plant, Indian hemp, and sumac fibers, the baskets are tight enough to carry water. Archaeological evidence from near Fort Rock has shown that people wove baskets in the area at least 9,000 years ago.

Throughout the 18th century and into the early 19th century, the Northern Paiute had numerous conflicts with tribes who lived to the northwest. The Wasco-Wishram and other Chinook tribes often encroached on the high desert landscape of the Northern Paiute territory. After one such incident in 1811, the Northern Paiute migrated north to the Columbia River and attacked Wasco canoes. Around this time, the Northern Paiute numbered approximately 7,500. The Snake War, a war between the natives and white settlers in the region in the 1860s, killed roughly two-thirds of the Northern Paiute population. The whites won the war and then set aside the Malheur Reservation for the Northern Paiute and other Oregon Native American tribes.

White settlers who had traveled to Oregon along the Oregon Trail began to live in the high desert region in the 1850s and 1860s after they had begun farming and logging in the Willamette Valley and other lands in western Oregon. Thousands of these emigrants reached the area from the west, crossing the Cascade Range to make land claims in eastern Oregon. The high desert area was settled by whites later than western Oregon in part because of Elijah White's failure to find a pass east through the Cascades. Once they had claimed more land, pioneers and members of the American government negotiated treaties with natives in the high desert and elsewhere in Oregon, often forcing them off their native lands and onto reservations.

In 1866, American soldiers established Camp Warner, a military camp near present-day Hart Mountain National Antelope Refuge in Lake County. They were sent from Boise, Idaho, to build a military camp in the high desert, and they built it east of the Warner Lakes because they doubted that they could cross the series of wetlands. Maj. Gen. George Crook disapproved of the soldiers' decision. He built a road across the lakes and moved the camp to the western side of them.

Of the four major cities in the high desert, Prineville was established earliest. Its post office originally opened under the name "Prine" in 1871. It was named for Barney Prine, a whisky and metal merchant in the area. Lakeview's post office was then established in 1876. At that time, Goose Lake was larger, and it was visible from the post office. The Burns post office opened in 1884 and the city was established in 1891. It was named for the Scottish poet Robert Burns. Bend's name was derived from the phrase "Farewell Bend," the location where pioneers traveling through the area last saw the Deschutes River. The Bend post office was established in 1904.

In 1878, the Bannock people and northern Shoshone tribes participated in the Bannock War, a war against white settlers in the region over the destruction of camas root—a major source of food for the natives—by white settlers' hogs. The Bannock and the Northern Paiute suffered from violence during the conflict, and once the white settlers had won the war, the natives were allotted into various reservations. The Northern Paiute were sent to the Yakama Indian Reservation and in later years have been dispersed throughout several reservations in the western United States.

White settlers created the  Burns Paiute Reservation, just north of Burns, in 1897. The reservation was established in 1972. It is home to the descendants of the Wada Tika band of Northern Paiutes. As of 1992, it had 356 members. As of 1980, there were 57 descendants of the Northern Paiute tribe living outside of the reservation.

Place names
In the 19th century, Oregon's high desert area was called the Great Sandy Desert (a misnomer, as there is very little sand in the region), the Rolling Sage Plain, and the Artemisia Desert. Over the years, the region has also been known as Oregon's Empty Quarter, the Great Wide Open, and Oregon's Cowboy Country. Today, many local residents call it the Oregon Outback. However, the old names are occasionally still used. A 1996 National Geographic magazine "Map of the United States Physical Landscape" used the pioneer name, Great Sandy Desert, to identify the southeastern quarter of Oregon. However, the region is most commonly known as Oregon's "High Desert". "High Desert" is the official name for a plain in Deschutes County, as recognized by the United States Board on Geographic Names. Variant names for the high desert are "Great Sandy Desert" and "Rolling Sage Plains".

Flora and fauna

The area is dominated by big sagebrush and rabbitbrush along with hardy grasses like Idaho fescue, bluebunch wheatgrass, and bunchgrass. In the spring, there are native wildflowers such as yellow Oregon sunshine, dwarf purple monkeyflower, sulfur buckwheat, Indian paintbrush, and mariposa lilies. Other high desert wildflowers common throughout the region include buttercups, larkspur, phlox, primroses, and coral mallow. The Oregon Badlands Wilderness also contains the oldest known tree in Oregon, a western juniper estimated to be more than 1,600 years old.

Hundreds of animal species are found in Oregon's high desert environment. In the Hart Mountain National Antelope Refuge alone, there are over 300, including 239 bird species and 42 mammals. Throughout the high desert region, mule deer, pronghorn, coyotes, American badgers, and black-tailed jackrabbits are common. Elk, bighorn sheep, cougars, bobcats, gray foxes, red foxes, North American porcupines, and North American beavers are also found in some parts of the high desert.

Smaller mammals native to the area include long-tailed weasels, woodchucks, cottontail rabbits, pygmy rabbits, golden-mantled ground squirrels, antelope squirrels, Townsend's ground squirrels, yellow-pine chipmunks, Ord's kangaroo rats, and northern pocket gophers. Mice species include Great Basin pocket mouse, northern grasshopper mouse, western harvest mouse, deer mouse, meadow mouse, and creeping vole. There are also numerous bat species that live in Oregon's high desert country.

Common high desert birds include sage-grouse, quail, and sage thrasher. Near high desert lakes and in riparian areas, there are American dusky flycatchers, yellow warblers, orange-crowned warblers, house wrens, spotted towhees, Brewer's blackbirds, western meadowlarks, swallows, and nighthawks. Mountain chickadees, Cassin's finches, black-headed grosbeaks, green-tailed towhees, yellow-rumped warblers, MacGillivray's warblers, mountain bluebirds, common ravens, northern flickers, and white-headed woodpeckers are common in parts of the region. Birds of prey include owls, hawks, prairie falcons, golden eagles, and bald eagles.

See also

Columbia Plateau
Northern Basin and Range (ecoregion)
Oregon High Desert Grotto

References

Works cited

 — 
 —

External links
High Desert Museum
Oregon Public Broadcasting program on Reub Long's Oregon Desert 
Oregon Public Broadcasting program on Abert Lake 
Oregon Public Broadcasting program on Desert Plants 
Oregon Natural Desert Association

Deserts and xeric shrublands in the United States
Deserts of Oregon
Great Basin deserts
Regions of Oregon